The 1930 Fresno State Bulldogs football team represented Fresno State Normal School—now known as California State University, Fresno—during the 1930 college football season.

Fresno State competed in the Far Western Conference (FWC). The 1930 team was led by second-year head coach Stanley Borleske and played home games at Fresno State College Stadium on the campus of Fresno City College in Fresno, California. They finished undefeated, as champion of the FWS, with a record of eight wins and no losses (8–0, 5–0 FWC). The Bulldogs outscored their opponents 154–66 for the season and held the other team to a touchdown or less in six of the eight games.

Schedule

Notes

References

Fresno State
Fresno State Bulldogs football seasons
Northern California Athletic Conference football champion seasons
College football undefeated seasons
Fresno State Bulldogs football